The Zanniat tribe are people of western Myanmar (Burma) who are a sub-group of the Chin peoples. The Zanniat tribe has fifty-seven sub-groupings and clans. The group's existence was recorded (along with three of its many sub-groups) in Burma's 1931 census after being absent in the Chin Hills gazette of 1896. In 1943, the Zanniat tribal groups of eastern Falam Township were recorded by Henry Stevenson (b. 1903, British colonial service in Burma). The Zanniat may also be known by similar sounding names such as Zahnyiet, Zanniet, Zanngiat and Zannaing.

Geography 
The capital city or myo (IPA: mjó) of the Zanniat is Webula. The Zanniat tribal lands stretch from the hilly regions around the eastern part of the Manipur river to the plains of the Sagaing region and fall within Falam Township. The Manipuri river, flowing in a south-easterly direction within the Falam township, makes a clear natural boundary of Zanniat lands. The Zanniat tribal land abuts Ngawn tribal land and the Tedim township in the north
 The land has thick vegetation with fauna. Forests within the area include the Khuanghlum, Lianthar, and Ngalsip forests. The lands encompass thirty-nine villages villages and towns.

Towns and villages in Zanniatland
 Congkua
 Darbo
 Farso (new Lunghawh)
 Haitui (inexistence)
 Hiangrun (Khua ngaingai) 
 Hlanzawl (new Khualai)
 Hmunli
 Kamunchuang (Cang-ai-va) 
 Kawlfang 
 Khitam
 Khualai
 Khuaval
 Khumzing
 Khupleng
 Kimniang
 Kuangdon (inexistence)
 Lianrih 
 Locom
 Lumbang
 Lumte
 Lunghawh
 Maihol
 Mualzawl (later included into greater Webula town)
 Murang
 Ngaizam
 Nimzawl (also new Nimzawl village founded)
 Pamunchuang
 Ralum
 Simcing
 Thanghluang
 Thawi/Tuphei/Zo (new Lunghawh village)
 Thiamthi
 Tidil (inexistance)
 Tlangphai (also known as Kulzam village)
 Tlortang
 Tlorzan
 Tulung (inexistance)
 Vanniam
 Webula
 Zalang
 Zatual
 Zultu

Language 
Zanniat is one of the Sino-Tibetan languages. Ethnologue lists Zanniat as one of the dialects of Falam language.

History 
Zanniat are the descendants of Zanniat. Zanniat was one of the sons of Chin Lung/ Chin Dung, a Shan Sawbwa (Saopha) of Kalemyo, whose father was Kale Kyitaungnyu, the ruler of Ava kingdom of Burma (Myanmar). Zanniat, Hlawnceu and Thuankai were three brothers who left Kalay or Vingpui (meaning fort in Zanniat language) from conflict, then moved to higher elevation which later known as Chin hills. Zanniat decided to settle down in Runral (The word "Runral" refers to the other side of a river in Zanniat language), a land which is eastern from Manipur river and it became Locom village and the name Locom means to settle in Zanniat language. Some of Zanniat's sons were Phunnim, Sumthang, Laizo, Siahthang, Zanniat (Niat Hang) and the descendants from each son were later became clans and families. Thuankai had two sons, named Hlawn Ceu and Phurh Hlum. Phurh Hlum had two wives. The descendants from Phurh Hlum's first wife are known as Nuhma family, meaning pervious or first in Zanniat language. Phurh Hlum had a second wife from Locom village and the descendants from his second wife are later known as Nuhnua family, meaning later or second in Zanniat language. One of Phurh Hlum sons was named as Zanniat, to commemorate the great grand father Zanniat and the descendants from this man are later known as Zanniat clan or family, which later cause conflicts in understanding the origin of Zanniat. The descendants comprising from Zanniat and Phurh Hlum, living in eastern side of Manipur river are commonly known as Zanniat people or Zanniat tribe. Among the sons of Zanniat, Laizo descendants live around Lumbang, while Sumthang descendants live around Webulah, Hluansang descendants being Chiefly clans settle in every Central Chin and Maraic tribal villages and in India (Mizoram) and Bangladesh (Chittagong hills tracts. Taisun [Tashon], Lerngo (Hualngo), Torr and Khualsim tribes also later settled with Zanniat tribe. Zanniat people trace their ancestry to the Chin, of Tibeto-Burman descent from origins in Mongolia. The early Chin people settled in the western plains of Sagaing when it was known as "Kauka" or "Vingpui", and later as "Kale". The word "Vingpui" refers to a type of brick fort. Thuankai had a son named Tlaisun (Tashons people)in English) whose later became one of the strongest tribe, founder of Falam or Fahlam, ruling most parts of Chin hills.

Taisun [Tashon] rule 
In 1810 A.D Taisun tribe collaborated with Zokhua and Chuncung villages and attacked and Khualai village of Zanniat tribe which resulted whole Zanniat tribe and the land became under the rule of Taisun.

British rule 
The British ruled Burma from 1824 to 1948. Traditionally, Zanniat culture emphasized the importance of the rule of the head of a group of any size, from household to nation. The Zanniat did not adapt to British rule and operated a Pau Chin Hau governance avoiding centralised rule or local puppet chiefs.

Religion 
Traditionally, Zanniat people believed in the existence of a supernatural being called "Pathian". The people also believed in other spiritual beings known as "Khuazing", to whom they offered sacrifices in return for favours and blessings. People also believed in the existence of bad spiritual beings and demons such as "Khawsia". 

The first Protestant Christian missionaries reached the Chin Hills on 15 March 1899. They were American Baptist workers, Laura and Arthur Carson. In 1906, Thang Tsin became the first Christian among Zanniat people. Roman Catholic missionaries arrived later.

References

Tribes of Asia
Ethnic groups in Myanmar